The Irish Abroad Unit was established in 2004 following an announcement by Brian Cowen TD, then Irish Minister of Foreign Affairs. The Irish Abroad Unit is a dedicated Unit within the Department of Foreign Affairs and coordinates the provision of services to Irish emigrants across the globe and administers financial support to organizations in the voluntary sector engaged in the delivery of services to Irish emigrants.  

Grants are extended to groups in the voluntary sector who provide advice and support to Irish people abroad, particularly those that help migrants access their rights and entitlements in their host countries. Priority is given to organizations that support the most vulnerable and marginalized, such as the older Irish community in Great Britain and undocumented Irish in the United States. Smaller grants have also been allocated to Irish groups in Australia, Canada, Argentina, South Africa, Zimbabwe, New Zealand, Singapore, France and Mexico as well as to a number of organizations in Ireland who provide pre-departure information and also advice to those emigrants who may be considering returning to Ireland. In 2007, the Irish Abroad Unit awarded grants of €14.165 million to organizations in eleven different countries.

Following increases in funding, the program has expanded to include a number of capital projects, as well as culture and heritage projects that support community networks and build on the interest of citizens abroad in their Irish heritage. 

In general, recipients of Emigrant Services funding are Irish community organizations who have a functioning board of management, show clear objectives and have an accounting framework in place. The payment of grants to individual Irish citizens’ resident abroad is beyond the remit of the Irish Abroad Unit.

References

External links 
 Department of Foreign Affairs
 Emigrant Advice Network
 Federation of Irish Societies, Great Britain
 Coalition of Irish Immigration Centers, USA

Overseas Irish organisations
Department of Foreign Affairs (Ireland)
Foreign relations of Ireland